San Antonio is a district of the Belén canton, in the Heredia province of Costa Rica.

Geography 
San Antonio has an area of  km² and an elevation of  metres.

Locations 
 Barrios: Chompipes (part), Escobal, Labores (part), San Vicente, Zaiquí

Demographics 

For the 2011 census, San Antonio had a population of  inhabitants.

Transportation

Road transportation 
The district is covered by the following road routes:
 National Route 111
 National Route 122

Rail transportation 
The Interurbano Line operated by Incofer goes through this district.

References 

Districts of Heredia Province
Populated places in Heredia Province